Ak-Chiy may refer to:

 Akchikarasu in Kyrgyzstan
  Akchi in Kazakhstan